Urteaga Alvarado, Mario (April 1, 1875 in Cajamarca – June 12, 1957 in Cajamarca) was a Peruvian painter. He originally worked as a painter, photographer and upon his return to Cajamarca from Lima he worked as a school teacher, farming and journalist.

Unlike their Indigenism colleagues, trained in the Escuela Nacional de Bellas Artes in Lima and assets, Urteaga was a self-taught artist and had developed the central work of his paintings in Cajamarca. This circumstance contributed to shaping the image of the artist as topical spontaneous product of his environment and to project an ambivalent perception of his work, sometimes classified as non-academic and as a manifestation of the independent indigenousness. With a mix of classicism and naturally it was fascinating to the viewer of his time, peasant scenes carefully composed by the artist seemed to embody the peripheral end of the nationalist aspirations of an entire generation would have achieved Urteaga display "Indians more Indians have been painted", according to the concluding sentence of Teodoro Núñez Ureta. The reality of his work and his life, however, is offers much more contradictory and complex.

His spontaneity and topicality are reminiscent of the caricatures of Pancho Fierro, yet his representation of the indigenous peoples of Peru and their daily life is serious. He is considered to be the first painter to portray Indian people without patronizing them, as can be seen in the Adobe Makers (1937, priv. col.) and Return of the Peasants (Lima, Mus. A.). An exhibition of his work was held at the Banco de la Nación, Lima, in 1989.

He was the first Peruvian painter with a work in the "MOMA" of New York City.

Footnotes

Latin American artists of indigenous descent
1875 births
1957 deaths
20th-century Peruvian painters
20th-century Peruvian male artists
People from Cajamarca
Peruvian male painters
19th-century Peruvian male artists